Maurice Joseph Sullivan (December 7, 1884 – August 9, 1953) was an American politician. He was the 15th and 18th lieutenant governor of Nevada and a U.S. Representative from Nevada. He was a member of the Democratic Party.

Biography
Sullivan was born in San Rafael, California, on December 7, 1884.  He attended the parochial schools of San Rafael, graduated from San Francisco Polytechnic High School, and attended San Francisco's Sacred Heart College.  He learned the retail business with the San Francisco firm of Holbrook, Merrill & Stratton.

Sullivan moved to Goldfield, Nevada, in 1906, where he worked as a sales representative and manager for a company that provided hardware and other supplies for gold miners and mining companies.  He eventually became the principal owner of the Wood-Sullivan Hardware Company and was an investor in several mining ventures.  While living in Goldfield he served on the town board, as president of the local chamber of commerce, and as president of the local volunteer fire department.

In 1914 he was elected Lieutenant Governor of Nevada and served from 1915 to 1927. During World War I he was adjutant general of the Nevada National Guard, as well as Nevada's federal disbursing officer and director of the draft.  He studied law, was admitted to the bar in 1923 and commenced practice in Carson City.

In 1938 Sullivan was again elected Lieutenant Governor, and he served from 1939 to 1942.

In 1942 Sullivan was elected to the 78th Congress, and he served one term, January 3, 1943 to January 3, 1945.  He was an unsuccessful candidate for renomination in 1944.  After leaving Congress Sullivan resumed practicing law in Reno.

Sullivan died in Reno on August 9, 1953.  He was buried in Reno's Our Mother of Sorrows (Mater Dolorosa) Cemetery.

References

External links

1884 births
1953 deaths
Lieutenant Governors of Nevada
People from Goldfield, Nevada
People from San Rafael, California
Democratic Party members of the United States House of Representatives from Nevada
20th-century American politicians